Valerio Bona or Buona (c. 1560c. 1620) was an Italian composer of the early Baroque; he was also a Franciscan friar. Little is known about his life. He appears to have spent time in Milan and Verona, and may have been a student of Costanzo Porta. His theoretical Regole del contraponto of 1595 was influenced by Gioseffo Zarlino. His musical works include masses and canzonas.

References
 Josef-Horst Lederer. "Bona, Valerio." Grove Music Online. Oxford Music Online. Oxford University Press, accessed October 22, 2013, http://www.oxfordmusiconline.com/subscriber/article/grove/music/03474

External links
 

 

Renaissance composers
Italian Baroque composers
Italian male classical composers
1560 births
1620 deaths
17th-century Italian composers
17th-century male musicians